The Kislaya Guba Tidal Power Station is an experimental project in Kislaya Guba, Russia.

The station is the world's 4th largest tidal power plant in operation since the Annapolis Royal Generating Station ceased operation. Station began operating in 1968, but was later shut down for 10 years until December 2004, when funding resumed. The old  French-built generation unit was dismantled. In 2004 was installed first new  generation unit, and in 2007 – second, . The site was originally chosen because the long and deep fjord had a fairly narrow outlet to the sea which could easily be dammed for the project. There are plans for two larger scale projects based on this design near Mezen, on the White Sea and Tugur on the Sea of Okhotsk.

See also 

 List of largest power stations in the world
 List of power stations in Russia
 List of tidal power stations

References 

Energy infrastructure completed in 1968
Tidal power stations in Russia
Tidal barrages
Hydroelectric power stations built in the Soviet Union